Ion Dumitra (born 30 January 1976) is a Romanian former professional footballer who played as a midfielder for teams such as Bihor Oradea, Jiul Petroșani, Minerul Lupeni or Alro Slatina, among others.

References

External links
 
 

1976 births
Living people
People from Balș
Romanian footballers
Association football midfielders
FC Bihor Oradea players
CSM Jiul Petroșani players
FC UTA Arad players
CS Minerul Lupeni players
ACF Gloria Bistrița players
Liga I players
Liga II players
Romanian football managers
Romanian expatriate footballers
Expatriate sportspeople in Germany
Expatriate footballers in Germany